Gaby André (1920–1972) was a French film actress.

Partial filmography

References

Bibliography 
 Mitchell, Charles P. The Great Composers Portrayed on Film, 1913 through 2002. McFarland, 2004.

External links 
 

1920 births
1972 deaths
People from Châlons-en-Champagne
20th-century French actresses
French expatriates in the United States